La Costeña may refer to:

La Costeña (airline), a Nicaraguan airline
La Costeña (food company), a Mexican company